The Appin Group is a thick sequence of metamorphosed Neoproterozoic sedimentary rocks that outcrop across the Central Highlands of Scotland, east of the Great Glen. It forms a part of the Dalradian Supergroup. 

It is divided into three subgroups each consisting of multiple named formations. In stratigraphic order i.e. youngest at the top, these are: 

Blair Atholl Subgroup
Islay Limestone Formation
Mullach Dubh Phyllites Formation
Lismore Limestone Formation
Cuil Bay Slates Formation

Ballachulish Subgroup 
Appin Phyllite & Limestone Formation 
Appin Quartzite Formation
Ballachulish Slate Formation
Ballachulish Limestone Formation

Lochaber Subgroup
Leven Schist Formation
Glencoe Quartzite Formation
Binnein Schist Formation
Binnein Quartzite Formation
Eilde Schist Formation
Eilde Quartzite Formation

This whole succession reflects alternate periods of deepening and filling of the sedimentary basin.

References

Geology of Scotland